Klunzinger's wrasse (Thalassoma rueppellii),  also known as Rüppell's wrasse, is a species of ray-finned fish, a wrasse from the family Labridae which is endemic to the Red Sea. It can reach   in total length. This species can be found in the aquarium trade.

References

External links
 

Klunzinger's wrasse
Labridae
Fish described in 1871